Prairie Crossing is a pair of Metra stations located in Libertyville, Illinois. They are serviced by the North Central Service and the Milwaukee District North Line. In Metra's zone-based fare system, both Prairie Crossing stations are in zone H.

The North Central Service station opened first, in 1996, along with the rest of the line. The Milwaukee District North Line platform opened as an infill station in 2004. The two lines cross at an at-grade diamond northwest of the station. A connector track is present at the diamond.

In terms of passenger boardings, Metra considers the Milwaukee District North Line and North Central Service platforms to be separate stations. The platforms are within walking distance of each other. As of 2018, the Milwaukee District North Line platform is considered to be the 128th busiest of Metra's 236 non-downtown stations, with an average of 368 weekday boardings. The North Central Service platform is considered to be the 194th busiest of Metra's 236 non-downtown stations, with an average of 87 weekday boardings.

On the Milwaukee District North Line, as of December 12, 2022, Prairie Crossing is served by 35 trains (16 inbound, 19 outbound) on weekdays, by 18 trains (nine in each direction) on Saturdays, and by all 18 trains (nine in each direction) on Sundays and holidays.

On the North Central Service, as of December 12, 2022, Prairie Crossing is served by 14 trains (seven in each direction) on weekdays.

References

External links 

North Central Service station from Google Maps Street View
Milwaukee District / North Line station from Google Maps Street View

Metra stations in Illinois
Libertyville, Illinois
Railway stations in Lake County, Illinois
Railway stations in the United States opened in 1996